Valley of the Giants may refer to:

Places
 Valley of the Giants (Oregon), a forest preserve
 Valley of the Giants (Michigan), a stand of virgin Old Growth cedar on South Manitou Island
 Valley of the Giants, Western Australia, Denmark, Western Australia

Music
 Valley of the Giants (band)
 Valley of the Giants (album), self-titled debut album

Films
 The Valley of the Giants (1919 film), a silent drama directed by James Cruze
 The Valley of the Giants (1927 film), directed by Charles Brabin
 Valley of the Giants (film), a 1938 film directed by William Keighley